Coghlan is a barrio (neighbourhood), of the city of Buenos Aires, Argentina.

It is the name of a middle class neighbourhood located between Belgrano, Saavedra, Núñez and Villa Urquiza; it was originally inhabited by Irish and English immigrants.

The 1887 sale of 30 hectares (75 acres) of land to the Mitre Railway led to the railway's extension under the direction of Irish Argentine engineer John Coghlan, in whose honor the train station was named. The sale of residential lots after 1891 led to the rapid growth of what was then a suburb of Buenos Aires and, in 1896, Dr. Ignacio Pirovano opened an emergency hospital, today among the city's public medical facilities.

Coghlan was formally designated as a barrio (borough) in 1968 and is today still a quiet bedroom community known for its big, English style residences.

References

External links 

 Statistics 
 Coghlan at Barriada 

Neighbourhoods of Buenos Aires